Świderski (feminine Świderska) is a Polish surname. It may refer to:

 Adrian Świderski (born 1986), Polish athlete
 Bartłomiej Świderski (born 1973), a Polish actor
 Janina Kraupe-Świderska (1921-2016), Polish printmaker
 Karol Świderski (born 1997), Polish footballer
 Piotr Świderski (born 1983), a Polish motorcyclist
 Sebastian Świderski (born 1977), a Polish volleyball player

Polish-language surnames